Camille Pin (born 25 August 1981) is a former professional French tennis player.

Her 2006 season was rather successful, for a player ranked lower than the top 100 in the WTA Tour. After a second-round loss to Serena Williams in the Australian Open, she made three ITF Circuit event finals, taking one of the titles at Lexington, Kentucky. She also made some reasonable showings at official WTA Tour events, especially qualifying for the Tier-I event at Indian Wells and making the second round. However, her 2006 Grand Slam second-round showing at the Australian Open would prove to be her best Grand Slam performance of the year, falling in the first round of every other major to tough opponents.

Pin made headlines at the 2007 Australian Open, after playing top seed Maria Sharapova in the first round and coming within two points of winning the match. After recovering from a 0–5 and 0–30 deficit in the final set, Pin eventually lost with a final score of 3–6, 6–4, 7–9.

Pin dated male professional tennis player Arnaud Clément of France.

On 28 May, 2010, she announced her retirement from professional tennis.

WTA career finals

Doubles: 1 (runner-up)

ITF Circuit finals

Singles: 15 (8–7)

Doubles: 3 (2–1)

Grand Slam singles performance timeline

References

External links
  
 
 
 
 Photos of Camille Pin 2008

1981 births
Living people
Sportspeople from Nice
French female tennis players
21st-century French women